Samedan railway station is a railway station in the municipality of Samedan, in the Swiss canton of Graubünden. It is an important interchange station on the Rhaetian Railway network between the Albula Railway line (between Chur and St. Moritz) and the Samedan–Pontresina railway. Hourly services operate on each line.

Services
The following services stop at Samedan:

 Glacier Express: Several round-trips per day between Zermatt and St. Moritz.
 Regio:
 limited service between Chur and St. Moritz.

References

External links
 
 

Railway stations in Graubünden
Rhaetian Railway stations
Railway stations in Switzerland opened in 1903